Both is a surname. Notable people with the surname include:

Andries Both, Dutch painter
Bob Both (born 1952), American record producer
Christiaan Both (1895–1977), Dutch sports shooter
Christiaan Both (born 1969), Dutch ecologist
Edward Both (1908–1987), Australian inventor
Jan Dirksz Both, Dutch painter
Kuno-Hans von Both (1884–1955, German soldier
Marcus Both (born 1979), Australian golfer
Miklós Both (born 1981), Hungarian musician 
Paul Both, German soldier
Pieter Both (1568–1615), Dutch politician

See also
Botha

Germanic-language surnames